Poplar was a railway station in Poplar, London, that was opened in 1840 by the Commercial Railway (later the London and Blackwall Railway (LBR)) and was situated between Millwall Junction and Blackwall,  down-line from . It was closed in 1926, at which time it was owned by the London and North Eastern Railway.

History
The station was opened on 6 July 1840 on the west side of Brunswick Street, to the north of the Blackwall Yard shipyard, but was re-sited five years later across the road to the east side. It remained open until 4 May 1926, when all passenger services on the line east of Stepney ceased. The station buildings were demolished in the 1930s but the platforms remained as the railway fell into disuse in the 1960s before finally being demolished in the early 1980s to make way for the Docklands Light Railway.

During its life there was another station named Poplar on the North London Railway (NLR), which was situated by the East India Dock Road, to the north-west of the LBR station. The NLR station was referred to as Poplar (East India Road) to avoid confusion with the LBR station. Poplar (East India Road) closed in 1944 and its site is now occupied by All Saints DLR station.

No trace of the LBR's Poplar station remains today and the site is occupied by Aspen Way and is adjacent to Blackwall DLR station. The only remaining building of Poplar station's era is a former accumulator tower for the adjacent Poplar Dock. The station's current namesake, Poplar DLR station, lies to the west of the original LBR station site.

References

External links
Poplar railway station on Subterranea Britannica
Map of Poplar & Blackwall from 1885

Disused railway stations in the London Borough of Tower Hamlets
Railway stations in Great Britain opened in 1840
Railway stations in Great Britain closed in 1926
Former London and Blackwall Railway stations
Railway station